Digital music technology encompasses digital instruments, computers, electronic effects units, software, or digital audio equipment by a performer, composer, sound engineer, DJ, or record producer to produce, perform or record music. The term refers to electronic devices, instruments, computer hardware, and software used in performance, playback, recording, composition, mixing, analysis, and editing of music.

Education

Professional training

Courses in music technology are offered at many different Universities as part of degree programs focusing on performance, composition, music research at the undergraduate and graduate level. The study of music technology is usually concerned with the creative use of technology for creating new sounds, performing, recording, programming sequencers or other music-related electronic devices, and manipulating, mixing and reproducing music. Music technology programs train students for careers in "...sound engineering, computer music, audio-visual production and post-production, mastering, scoring for film and multimedia, audio for games, software development, and multimedia production." Those wishing to develop new music technologies often train to become an audio engineer working in R&D. Due to the increasing role of interdisciplinary work in music technology, individuals developing new music technologies may also have backgrounds or training in computer programming, computer hardware design, acoustics, record producing or other fields.

Use of music technology in education
Digital music technologies are widely used to assist in music education for training students in the home, elementary school, middle school, high school, college and university music programs. Electronic keyboard labs are used for cost-effective beginner group piano instruction in high schools, colleges, and universities. Courses in music notation software and basic manipulation of audio and MIDI can be part of a student's core requirements for a music degree. Mobile and desktop applications are available to aid the study of music theory and ear training. Digital pianos, such as those offered by Roland, provide interactive lessons and games using the built-in features of the instrument to teach music fundamentals.

History

,  

Early pioneers  included Luigi Russolo, Halim El-Dabh, Pierre Schaeffer, Pierre Henry, Edgard Varèse, Karlheinz Stockhausen, Ikutaro Kakehashi, King Tubby., and others who manipulated sounds using tape machines—splicing tape and changing its playback speed to alter pre-recorded samples. This style, invented by Karlheinz Stockhausen, involves creating new sounds without the use of pre-existing material. Unlike , which primarily focuses on timbre,  focuses on structure. Influences of these two styles still prevail today in today's modern music and music technology. The concept of the software digital audio workstation is the emulation of a traditional recording studio. Colored strips, known as regions, can be spliced, stretched, and re-ordered, analogous to tape. Similarly, software representations of classic synthesizers emulate their analog counterparts.

Analog synthesizer history 

Classic analog synthesizers include the Moog Minimoog, ARP Odyssey, Yamaha CS-80, Korg MS-20, Sequential Circuits Prophet-5, Roland TB-303, Roland Alpha Juno. The most iconic bass synthesizer is the Roland TB-303, widely used in acid house music.

Digital synthesizer history 

Classic digital synthesizers include the Fairlight CMI, PPG Wave, Nord Modular and Korg M1.

Digital synthesizer in Japan 

Through the 1970s and 1980s, Japanese synthesizer manufacturers produced more affordable synthesizers than those produced in America, with synthesizers made by Yamaha Corporation, Roland Corporation, Korg, Kawai and other companies. Yamaha's DX7 was one of the first mass-market, relatively inexpensive synthesizer keyboards. The DX7 is an FM synthesis based digital synthesizer manufactured from 1983 to 1989. It was the first commercially successful digital synthesizer. Its distinctive sound can be heard on many recordings, especially pop music from the 1980s. The monotimbral, 16-note polyphonic DX7 was the moderately priced model of the DX series keyboard synthesizers. Over 200,000 of the original DX7 were made,and it remains one of the best-selling synthesizers of all time.

Computer music history

Max Mathews 

Computer and synthesizer technology joining together changed the way music is made, and is one of the fastest changing aspects of music technology today. Max Mathews,  at Bell Telephone Laboratories' Acoustic and Behavioural Research Department, is responsible for some of the first digital music technology in the 50s. 

At Bell Laboratories, Matthews conducted research to improve the telecommunications quality for long-distance phone calls. Owing to long-distance and low-bandwidth, audio quality over phone calls across the United States was poor. Thus, Matthews devised a method in which sound was synthesized via computer on the distant end rather than transmitted. Matthews was an amateur violinist, and during a conversation with his superior, John Pierce at Bell Labs, Pierce posed the idea of synthesizing music through a computer since Matthews had already synthesized speech. Matthews agreed, and beginning in the 1950s wrote a series of programs known as MUSIC. MUSIC consisted of two files—and orchestra file containing data telling the computer how to synthesize sound—and a score file instructing the program what notes to play using the instruments defined in the orchestra file. Matthews wrote five iterations of MUSIC, calling them MUSIC I-V respectively. Subsequently, as the program was adapted and expanded as it was written to run on various platforms, its name changed to reflect its new changes. This series of programs became known as the MUSICn paradigm. The concept of the MUSIC now exists in the form of Csound.

Later Max Matthews worked as an advisor to IRCAM (Institut de recherche et coordination acoustique/musique; English: Institute for Research and Coordination in Acoustics/Music) in the late 1980s. There, he taught Miller Puckette, a researcher. Puckette developed a program in which music could be programmed graphically. The program could transmit and receive MIDI messages to generate interactive music in real-time. Inspired by Matthews, Puckette named the program Max. Later, a researcher named David Zicarelli visited IRCAM, saw the capabilities of Max and felt it could be developed further. He took a copy of Max with him when he left and eventually added capabilities to process audio signals. Zicarelli named this new part of the program MSP after Miller Puckette. Zicarelli developed the commercial version of MaxMSP and sold it at his company, Cycling '74, beginning in 1997. The company has since been acquired by Ableton.

Later history 
The first generation of professional commercially available computer music instruments, or workstations as some companies later called them, were very sophisticated elaborate systems that cost a great deal of money when they first appeared. They ranged from $25,000 to $200,000. The two most popular were the Fairlight, and the Synclavier.

It was not until the advent of MIDI that general-purpose computers started to play a role in music production. Following the widespread adoption of MIDI, computer-based MIDI editors and sequencers were developed. MIDI-to-CV/Gate converters were then used to enable analogue synthesizers to be controlled by a MIDI sequencer.

Reduced prices in personal computers caused the masses to turn away from the more expensive workstations. Advancements in technology have increased the speed of hardware processing and the capacity of memory units. Powerful programs for sequencing, recording, notating, and mastering music.

MIDI history 
At the NAMM Show of 1983 in Los Angeles, MIDI was released. A demonstration at the convention showed two previously incompatible analog synthesizers, the Prophet 600 and Roland Jupiter-6, communicating with each other, enabling a player to play one keyboard while getting the output from both of them. This was a massive breakthrough in the 1980s, as it allowed synths to be accurately layered in live shows and studio recordings. MIDI enables different electronic instruments and electronic music devices to communicate with each other and with computers. The advent of MIDI spurred a rapid expansion of the sales and production of electronic instruments and music software.

In 1985, several of the top keyboard manufacturers created the MIDI Manufacturers Association (MMA). This newly founded association standardized the MIDI protocol by generating and disseminating all the documents about it. With the development of the MIDI File Format Specification by Opcode, every music software company's MIDI sequencer software could read and write each other's files.

Since the 1980s, personal computers developed and became the ideal system for utilizing the vast potential of MIDI. This has created a large consumer market for software such as MIDI-equipped electronic keyboards, MIDI sequencers and digital audio workstations. With universal MIDI protocols, electronic keyboards, sequencers, and drum machines can all be connected together.

Vocal synthesis history until 1980s

VODER on Bell Lab.

Coinciding with the history of computer music is the history of vocal synthesis. Prior to Max Matthews synthesizing speech with a computer, analog devices were used to recreate speech. In the 1930s, an engineer named Holmer Dudley invented the VODER (Voice Operated Demonstrator), an electro-mechanical device which generated a sawtooth wave and white-noise. Various parts of the frequency spectrum of the waveforms could be filtered to generate the sounds of speech. Pitch was modulated via a bar on a wrist strap worn by the operator. In the 1940s Dudley, invented the VOCODER (Voice Operated Coder). Rather than synthesizing speech from scratch, this machine operated by accepting incoming speech and breaking it into its spectral components. In the late 1960s and early 1970s, bands and solo artists began using the VOCODER to blend speech with notes played on a synthesizer.

Singing Kelly-Lochbaum Vocal Tract on Bell Lab.

Meanwhile, at Bell Laboratories, Max Matthews worked with researchers Kelly and Lachbaum to develop a model of the vocal tract to study how its prosperities contributed to speech generation. Using the model of the vocal tract, —a method in which a computer estimates the formants and spectral content of each word based on information about the vocal model, including various applied filters representing the vocal tract—to make a computer (an IBM 704) sing for the first time in 1962. The computer performed a rendition of "Bicycle Built for Two."

CHANT on IRCAM
In the 1970s at IRCAM in France, researchers developed a piece of software called CHANT (French for "sing"). CHANT was based FOF synthesis, in which the peak frequencies of a sound are created and shaped using granular synthesis—as opposed to filtering frequencies to create speech.

Concatenation synthesis using MIDI
Through the 1980s and 1990s as MIDI devices became commercially available, speech was generated by mapping MIDI data to samples of the components of speech stored in sample libraries.

Synthesizers and drum machines

Synthesizers

A synthesizer is an electronic musical instrument that generates electric signals that are converted to sound through instrument amplifiers and loudspeakers or headphones. Synthesizers may either imitate existing sounds (instruments, vocal, natural sounds, etc.), or generate new electronic timbres or sounds that did not exist before. They are often played with an electronic musical keyboard, but they can be controlled via a variety of other input devices, including music sequencers, instrument controllers, fingerboards, guitar synthesizers, wind controllers, and electronic drums. Synthesizers without built-in controllers are often called sound modules, and are controlled using a controller device.

Synthesizers use various methods to generate a signal. Among the most popular waveform synthesis techniques are subtractive synthesis, additive synthesis, wavetable synthesis, frequency modulation synthesis, phase distortion synthesis, physical modeling synthesis and sample-based synthesis. Other less common synthesis types include subharmonic synthesis, a form of additive synthesis via subharmonics (used by mixture trautonium), and granular synthesis, sample-based synthesis based on grains of sound, generally resulting in soundscapes or clouds. In the 2010s, synthesizers are used in many genres of pop, rock and dance music. Contemporary classical music composers from the 20th and 21st century write compositions for synthesizer.

Drum machines

A drum machine is an electronic musical instrument designed to imitate the sound of drums, cymbals, other percussion instruments, and often basslines. Drum machines either play back prerecorded samples of drums and cymbals or synthesized re-creations of drum/cymbal sounds in a rhythm and tempo that is programmed by a musician. Drum machines are most commonly associated with electronic dance music genres such as house music, but are also used in many other genres. They are also used when session drummers are not available or if the production cannot afford the cost of a professional drummer. In the 2010s, most modern drum machines are sequencers with a sample playback (rompler) or synthesizer component that specializes in the reproduction of drum timbres. Though features vary from model to model, many modern drum machines can also produce unique sounds, and allow the user to compose unique drum beats and patterns.

Electro-mechanical drum machines were first developed in 1949, with the invention of the Chamberlin Rhythmate. Transistorized electronic drum machines Seeburg Select-A-Rhythm appeared in 1964. 

Classic drum machines include the Korg Mini Pops 120, PAiA Programmable Drum Set, Roland CR-78, LinnDrum, Roland TR-909, Oberheim DMX, E-MU SP-12, Alesis HR-16, and Elektron SPS1 Machinedrum (in chronological order).

Drum machines in Japan

 followed by drum machines from Korg and Ikutaro's later Roland Corporation also appearing in popular music from the early 1970s. Sly and the Family Stone's 1971 album There's a Riot Goin' On helped to popularize the sound of early drum machines, along with Timmy Thomas' 1972 R&B hit "Why Can't We Live Together" and George McCrae's 1974 disco hit "Rock Your Baby" which used early Roland rhythm machines.

Early drum machines sounded drastically different than the drum machines that gained their peak popularity in the 1980s and defined an entire decade of pop music. The most iconic drum machine was the Roland TR-808, widely used in hip hop and dance music.

Sampling technology after 1980s

Digital sampling technology, introduced in the 1970s,  Devices that use sampling, record a sound digitally (often a musical instrument, such as a piano or flute being played), and replay it when a key or pad on a controller device (e.g., an electronic keyboard, electronic drum pad, etc.) is pressed or triggered. Samplers can alter the sound using various audio effects and audio processing. Sampling has its roots in France with the sound experiments carried out by musique concrète practitioners.

In the 1980s, when the technology was still in its infancy, digital samplers cost tens of thousands of dollars and they were only used by the top recording studios and musicians. These were out of the price range of most musicians. Early samplers include the 8-bit Electronic Music Studios MUSYS-3 circa 1970, Computer Music Melodian in 1976, Fairlight CMI in 1979, Emulator I in 1981, Synclavier II Sample-to-Memory (STM) option circa 1980, Ensoniq Mirage in 1984, and Akai S612 in 1985. The latter's successor, the Emulator II (released in 1984), listed for $8,000. Samplers were released during this period with high price tags, such as the K2000 and K2500.

Some important hardware samplers include the Kurzweil K250, Akai MPC60, Ensoniq Mirage, Ensoniq ASR-10, Akai S1000, E-mu Emulator, and Fairlight CMI.

One of the biggest uses of sampling technology was by hip-hop music DJs and performers in the 1980s. Before affordable sampling technology was readily available, DJs
would use a technique pioneered by Grandmaster Flash to manually repeat certain parts in a song by juggling between two separate turntables. This can be considered as an early precursor of sampling. In turn, this turntablism technique originates from Jamaican dub music in the 1960s, and was introduced to American hip hop in the 1970s.

In the 2000s, most professional recording studios use digital technologies. In recent years, many samplers have only included digital technology. This new generation of digital samplers are capable of reproducing and manipulating sounds. Digital sampling plays an integral part in some genres of music, such as hip-hop and trap. Advanced sample libraries have made complete performances of orchestral compositions possible that sound similar to a live performance. Modern sound libraries allow musicians to have the ability to use the sounds of almost any instrument in their productions.

Sampling technology in Japan
Early samplers include the 12-bit Toshiba  in 1981.

The first affordable sampler in Japan was the Ensoniq Mirage in 1984. Also the AKAI S612 became available in 1985, retailed for US$895. Other companies soon released affordable samplers, including Oberheim DPX-1 in 1987, and more by Korg, Casio, Yamaha, and Roland. Some important hardware samplers in Japan include the Akai Z4/Z8, Roland V-Synth, Casio FZ-1.

MIDI

MIDI has been the musical instrument industry standard interface since the 1980s through to the present day. It dates back to June 1981, when Roland Corporation founder Ikutaro Kakehashi proposed the concept of standardization between different manufacturers' instruments as well as computers, to Oberheim Electronics founder Tom Oberheim and Sequential Circuits president Dave Smith. In October 1981, Kakehashi, Oberheim and Smith discussed the concept with representatives from Yamaha, Korg and Kawai. In 1983, the MIDI standard was unveiled by Kakehashi and Smith.

Some universally accepted varieties of MIDI software applications include music instruction software, MIDI sequencing software, music notation software, hard disk recording/editing software, patch editor/sound library software, computer-assisted composition software, and virtual instruments. Current developments in computer hardware and specialized software continue to expand MIDI applications.

Computers in music technology after 1980s
Following the widespread adoption of MIDI, computer-based MIDI editors and sequencers were developed. MIDI-to-CV/Gate converters were then used to enable analogue synthesizers to be controlled by a MIDI sequencer.

Reduced prices in personal computers caused the masses to turn away from the more expensive workstations. Advancements in technology have increased the speed of hardware processing and the capacity of memory units. Software developers write new, more powerful programs for sequencing, recording, notating, and mastering music.

Digital audio workstation software, such as Pro Tools, Logic, and many others, have gained popularity among the vast array of contemporary music technology in recent years. Such programs allow the user to record acoustic sounds with a microphone or software instrument, which may then be layered and organized along a timeline and edited on a flat-panel display of a computer. Recorded segments can be copied and duplicated ad infinitum, without any loss of fidelity or added noise (a major contrast from analog recording, in which every copy leads to a loss of fidelity and added noise). Digital music can be edited and processed using a multitude of audio effects. Contemporary classical music sometimes uses computer-generated sounds—either pre-recorded or generated and manipulated live—in conjunction or juxtaposed on classical acoustic instruments like the cello or violin. Music is scored with commercially available notation software.

In addition to the digital audio workstations and music notation software, which facilitate the creation of fixed media (material that does not change each time it is performed), software facilitating interactive or generative music continues to emerge. Composition based on conditions or rules (algorithmic composition) has given rise to software which can automatically generate music based on input conditions or rules. Thus, the resulting music evolves each time conditions change. Examples of this technology include software designed for writing music for video games—where music evolves as a player advances through a level or when certain characters appear—or music generated from artificial intelligence trained to convert biometrics like EEG or ECG readings into music. Because this music is based on user interaction, it will be different each time it is heard. Other examples of generative music technology include the use of sensors connected to computer and artificial intelligence to generate music based on captured data, such as environmental factors, the movements of dancers, or physical inputs from a digital device such as a mouse or game controller. Software applications offering capabilities for generative and interactive music include SuperCollider, MaxMSP/Jitter, and Processing. Interactive music is made possible through physical computing, where the data from the physical world affects a computer's output and vice versa.

Singing synthesis after 2010s
In the 2010s, Singing synthesis technology has taken advantage of the recent advances in artificial intelligence—deep listening and machine learning to better represent the nuances of the human voice. New high fidelity sample libraries combined with digital audio workstations facilitate editing in fine detail, such as shifting of formats, adjustment of vibrato, and adjustments to vowels and consonants. Sample libraries for various languages and various accents are available. With today's advancements in Singing synthesis, artists sometimes use sample libraries in lieu of backing singers.

Timeline

1917 : Leon Theremin invented the prototype of the Theremin
1944 : Halim El-Dabh produces earliest electroacoustic tape music
1952 : Harry F. Olson and Herbert Belar invent the RCA Synthesizer
1952 : Osmand Kendal develops the Composer-Tron for the Marconi Wireless Company
1956 : Raymond Scott develops the Clavivox
1958 : Yevgeny Murzin along with several colleagues create the ANS synthesizer
1959 : Wurlitzer manufactures The Sideman, the first commercial electro-mechanical drum machine
1963 : The Mellotron starts to be manufactured in London
1964 : The Moog synthesizer is released
1968 : King Tubby pioneers dub music, an early form of popular electronic music
1970 : ARP 2600 is manufactured
1982 : Sony and Philips introduce compact disc
1983 : Introduction of MIDI
1986 : The first digital consoles appear
1987 : Digidesign markets Sound Tools

Timeline in Japan

1963 : Keio Electronics (later Korg) produces the DA-20
1964 : Ikutaro Kakehashi debuts Ace Tone R-1 Rhythm Ace, the first electronic drum
1965 : Nippon Columbia patents an early electronic drum machine
1966 : Korg releases Donca-Matic DE-20, an early electronic drum machine
1967 : Ace Tone releases FR-1 Rhythm Ace, the first drum machine to enter popular music
1967 :  First PCM recorder developed by NHK
1969 : Matsushita engineer Shuichi Obata invents first direct-drive turntable, Technics SP-10
1973 : Yamaha release Yamaha GX-1, the first polyphonic synthesizer
1974 : Yamaha build first digital synthesizer
1977 : Roland release MC-8, an early microprocessor-driven CV/Gate digital sequencer
1978 : Roland releases CR-78, the first microprocessor-driven drum machine
1979 : Casio releases VL-1, the first commercial digital synthesizer
1980 : Roland releases TR-808, the most widely used drum machine in popular music
1980 : Roland introduces DCB protocol and DIN interface with TR-808
1980 : Yamaha releases GS-1, the first FM digital synthesizer
1980 : Kazuo Morioka creates Firstman SQ-01, the first bass synth with a sequencer
1981 : Roland releases TB-303, a bass synthesizer that lays foundations for acid house music
1981 : Toshiba's , the first PCM digital sampler in Japan, introduced with Yellow Magic Orchestra's Technodelic
1982 : First MIDI synthesizers released, Roland Jupiter-6 and Prophet 600
1983 : Roland releases MSQ-700, the first MIDI sequencer
1983 : Roland releases TR-909, the first MIDI drum machine
1983 : Yamaha releases DX7, the first commercially successful digital synthesizer
1985 : Akai releases the Akai S612, a digital sampler
1988 : Akai introduces the Music Production Controller (MPC) series of digital samplers
1994 : Yamaha unveils the ProMix 01

See also
 List of music software

References

Further reading

External links 
 Music Technology in Education
 Music Technology Resources
 Detailed history of electronic instruments and electronic music technology at '120 years of Electronic Music'

 
Sound recording
Audio electronics
Audio software
Music history
Musical instruments